François Chauvon was a Baroque composer and oboist.  He was a pupil of François Couperin.  In 1717 he compiled a collection of solos for the oboe entitled Tibiades.  His other published works are dated between the years of 1712 and 1736.

References

French Baroque composers
French classical oboists
Male oboists
Year of birth missing
Year of death missing
Place of birth missing
French male classical composers
17th-century male musicians